Lexington Historic District in Lexington, Mississippi is a historic district that was listed on the National Register of Historic Places in 2001.

It included 225 contributing buildings, a Confederate monument, the brick streets of the district (considered to be a separate resource), and 94 non-contributing buildings.  Three resources were already listed on the National Register as the Holmes County Courthouse.

References

Geography of Holmes County, Mississippi
Historic districts on the National Register of Historic Places in Mississippi
Italianate architecture in Mississippi
National Register of Historic Places in Holmes County, Mississippi